Merry from Lena is a 1966 album by Lena Horne. Released in 1966, this Christmas album marked Horne's departure from United Artists Records and the recording industry until her return at Skye Records in 1970.

The album was reissued on CD by Capitol (1990), Razor & Tie (1995), and DRG (2007). All CD issues of the album include a bonus track, "Santa Claus Is Comin' to Town", which was not included on the original LP.

Track listing

Original release
 "Jingle All the Way" (Ray Ellis, Al Stillman) – 2:36
 "The Christmas Song" (Mel Tormé, Bob Wells) – 3:19
 "Winter Wonderland" (Felix Bernard, Richard B. Smith) – 2:11
 "White Christmas" (Irving Berlin) – 2:42
 "Let It Snow! Let It Snow! Let It Snow!" (Sammy Cahn, Jule Styne) –  2:23
 "The Little Drummer Boy" (Katherine K. Davis) – 2:26
 "Rudolph the Red-Nosed Reindeer" (Johnny Marks) – 3:15
 "What Are You Doing New Year's Eve?" (Frank Loesser) – 2:40
 "Have Yourself a Merry Little Christmas" (Ralph Blane, Hugh Martin) – 3:39
 "Silent Night" (Franz Gruber, Josef Mohr) – 2:41

CD bonus track
 "Santa Claus Is Comin' to Town" (J. Fred Coots, Haven Gillespie) – 2:59

Personnel

Performance 
 Lena Horne – vocals
 Jack Parnell - Orchestration, Conductor

References 

Lena Horne albums
United Artists Records albums
Albums arranged by Ray Ellis
Albums produced by Ray Ellis
1966 Christmas albums
Christmas albums by American artists
Razor & Tie albums
Capitol Records albums
Albums conducted by Jack Parnell
Jazz Christmas albums